"Don't Sweat the Technique" is a song recorded by Eric B. & Rakim for their 1992 album Don't Sweat the Technique, and released as a single on June 27, 1992.

The song was written and produced by Eric B. & Rakim.

Samples
The song contains a sample of "Give It Up" by Kool & the Gang.

Charts

References

1992 songs
1992 singles
American hip hop songs
MCA Records singles
Eric B. & Rakim songs